The Hamilton Tiger Cubs were a Canadian junior ice hockey team in the Ontario Hockey Association from 1953 to 1960. The team was based in Hamilton, Ontario.

History
The Hamilton juniors which they were called initially in the early part of 1953.  At the time Hamilton had the historic senior OHA team still called the "tigers" in the city but sadly the popularity of the team was fading due to mismanagement and the city of Hamilton being more attracted to younger hockey prospects vs senior players.

The franchise was partnered with the Detroit Red wings from day one just as the previous season when the juniors were in Windsor.    During this time  when the local newspaper  covered hockey,  The paper specifically called the OHA/OHL the "cubs"  and that was adopted by mid season vs the "juniors".        
The Tiger Cubs played from 1953 to 1960, after which the team was finally renamed to the Red Wings as they wanted to emphasize the Detroit connection and increase ticket sales .

The best season for the Tiger Cubs was 1958. The team reached the OHA finals for the J. Ross Robertson Cup. They were defeated by the Toronto Marlboros 4 wins to 1, with 1 tie game.

There were also previous OHA Jr. teams in Hamilton. The Hamilton Szabos played from the early 1940s to 1947. In the 1930s Hamilton had an OHA Jr. team known as the Bengal Cubs. In the 1920s there was a Junior Tigers team at the same time as the NHL Tigers team.

The Tiger Cubs played home games at the Barton Street Arena, then known as the Hamilton Forum.

Players

Award winners
1957-1958 - Murray Oliver, Red Tilson Trophy, Most valuable player
1953-1954 - Dennis Riggin, Dave Pinkney Trophy, Lowest team goals against average.

NHL alumni
Alumnus Brian Kilrea became one of the most notable names ever in Canadian junior hockey, and was inducted into the Hockey Hall of Fame as a coach. Fellow alumnus Pat Quinn coached in the NHL, most recently with the Toronto Maple Leafs, as well as the Canadian national men's hockey team.

Yearly results

References

Defunct Ontario Hockey League teams
Ice hockey teams in Hamilton, Ontario
1953 establishments in Ontario
1960 disestablishments in Ontario
Ice hockey clubs established in 1953
Sports clubs disestablished in 1960